Álvaro Silva (born 31 December 1920) is a Portuguese fencer. He competed in the individual and team sabre events at the 1952 Summer Olympics.

References

External links
 

1920 births
Possibly living people
Portuguese male sabre fencers
Olympic fencers of Portugal
Fencers at the 1952 Summer Olympics